is a Japanese rugby union player who plays as a Scrum-half.

International Tries 
As of 14 November 2022

References

External links
 

1997 births
Living people
Rugby union scrum-halves
Sunwolves players
Japanese rugby union players
Japan international rugby union players
Tokyo Sungoliath players
21st-century Japanese people